The men's 100 metre butterfly swimming competition at the 1998 Asian Games in Bangkok was held on 8 December at the Thammasat Aquatic Center.

Schedule
All times are Indochina Time (UTC+07:00)

Results 
Legend
DNS — Did not start

Heats

Finals

Final B

Final A

References

External links
Official website

Swimming at the 1998 Asian Games